"Champion" is a song by English group Clement Marfo & The Frontline. It was released as a single in the United Kingdom as a digital download on 20 July 2012. The song peaked at number 38 on the UK Singles Chart. It features on the soundtrack of the video game F1 2011 and the 2010 film StreetDance 3D, and was the official theme song of the WWE Royal Rumble pay-per-view in 2013. The song was also used during CM Punk's 434 day reign as WWE Champion as a tribute.

Music video
A music video to accompany the release of "Champion" was first released on YouTube on May 25, 2012.

Track listing

Chart performance

Release history

References

External links
 Clement Marfo on Twitter
 Clement Marfo & The Frontline on Facebook
 Official website

2012 singles
2012 songs
British hip hop songs
Rap rock songs
Warner Music Group singles